The NWA Tennessee Tag Team Championship was a secondary tag team title promoted as the name indicates mainly in the Tennessee region from 1967 until 1977, first by Gulf Coast Championship Wrestling and occasionally NWA Mid-America from 1967 to 1974 then by its successor Southeast Championship Wrestling from 1974 to 1977 when it was abandoned. Because the championship was a professional wrestling championship, it was not won or lost competitively but instead by the decision of the bookers of a wrestling promotion. The championship was awarded after the chosen wrestler "won" a match to maintain the illusion that professional wrestling is a competitive sport.

Title history

See also
Gulf Coast Championship Wrestling / Southeast Championship Wrestling
NWA Mid-America
National Wrestling Alliance

Footnotes

References
General reference

Specific references

National Wrestling Alliance championships
Professional wrestling in Tennessee
Continental Championship Wrestling championships
NWA Mid-America championships
Tag team wrestling championships
National Wrestling Alliance state wrestling championships
1967 establishments in Tennessee
1970s disestablishments in Tennessee